IA, Ia, or ia may refer to:

Arts and entertainment
 Ia, an 1892 novelette by Arthur Quiller-Couch
 "Iä", a fictional word in the works of H. P. Lovecraft
 International Alliance of Theatrical Stage Employees (IATSE), which also goes by IA
 International Artists, a record label

Businesses and organizations
 Indian Airlines, logo
 Indiana Academy, a school
 International Academy, Bloomfield Hills, Michigan
 International Artists, a record label
 Internet Archaeology, an electronic journal
 Internet Archive, online digital library and host organization of the Wayback Machine
 Iraqi Airways (IATA airline designator IA)
 Aircraft model prefix of Fabrica Argentina de Aviones, e.g. FMA IA 62
 Impact assessment of public policy

Government, law, and military
Indian Army, the Indian Army
Indonesian Army, the Indonesian Army
Individual augmentee, U.S. military person temporarily assigned to a unit
 Indecent assault, sexual criminal offense

Language
 Ia (cuneiform), a sign in cuneiform writing
 Inter alia (i.a.), Latin meaning "among other things"
 Interlingua (ISO 639-2 code: ia)
 Romanization of Cyrillic Я letter
 Inshallah (iA), used by English-speaking Muslims.

People
 Ia or Violet of Persia, fourth-century martyr, feast day September 11
 Saint Ia of Cornwall
 Mattias Eklundh, Swedish guitarist

Places
 Ia or Oia, Greece, on Santorini
 Iowa, U.S. (postal abbreviation)
 Iá River, a river in Brazil

Science and technology

Archaeology
 Institute of Archaeology, Chinese Academy of Social Sciences (IA)
 IA, The Journal of the Society for Industrial Archeology
 Industrial archaeology
 Iron Age IA I, IA IIA, etc., in archaeology of Israel

Biology and medicine
 IA (chemotherapy), with Idarubicin and cytarabine
 Ia (genus), of vespertilionid bats
 Phase Ia of a clinical trial
 Immunoassay, biochemical test to measure concentrations through antibody or antigen

Computing and electronics
 IA (vocaloid), in software
 IA-32, Intel Architecture, 32-bit
 IA-64, Intel Architecture, 64-bit
 Implicit authentication,  by a smart device
 Human intelligence amplification through technology
 Intelligent agent, in artificial intelligence
 Information architecture, the structural design of shared information
 Information assurance, dealing with trust aspects of information

Other uses in science and technology
 Group IA (or Ia), an obsolete designation for the group 1 elements
 Type Ia supernova, a subtype of Type I supernova
 Interactions of actors theory, by Gordon Pask

Other uses
 Internal affairs (disambiguation)
 Intermediate in Arts, an academic degree
 Internal audit of an organization's operations
 International affairs, alternative term for International relations, the study of politics, economics and law on a global level
 Íþróttabandalag Akraness or ÍA, an Icelandic football team
 Mazda2, a 2002–present Japanese subcompact car, sold in North America as the Scion iA and Toyota Yaris iA

See also
 1A (disambiguation)
 AI (disambiguation)